Michelle Nguyen, known professionally as Coca Michelle, is a British nail artist based in the United States. Michelle is known for her detailed style that often includes non-traditional materials. She is best known as a celebrity manicurist and has worked with Teyana Taylor, Megan Thee Stallion, and Cardi B. Coca Michelle was named to the 2023 Forbes 30 under 30 list.

Life and career 
Coca Michelle was born Michelle Nguyen in East London, England. Her parents were manicurists who eventually opened their own nail salon. Coca began to do nails at age six due to her frequent exposure to the business. By age nine she was painting freestyle designs for her parents' clients.

Coca moved to the United States to attend college at Fashion Institute of Design & Merchandising and interned in the fashion world. She took a part-time job at a nail salon and then realized she would like to pursue it full-time. She transitioned to doing nails at Laqué Nail Bar and used social media to promote her work. She credits that time with improving her style. Coca specializes in long nails, anime-style art, and nontraditional designs and materials.

In 2017 she was recommended to Teyana Taylor, who hired her; later, Coca Michelle accompanied her on tour. In 2019 she and Taylor opened the salon Junie Bee Nails in Harlem.

Other clients include Cardi B, Christina Aguilera, Rosalía, Summer Walker, and Jhené Aiko.

Coca Michelle gained wider prominence as Megan Thee Stallion's key nail artist. Some of the work she did for Megan that gained press attention was a deep sea manicure, claw-like designs for the WAP music video, and gold appliqué body part nails.

Coca resides in Los Angeles.

Accolades 
 2023, Forbes 30 under 30 (Art & Style)

References

External links 
 Official Instagram

Year of birth missing (living people)
Living people
21st-century British women artists
Fashion Institute of Technology alumni
Cosmetics people
21st-century English women artists